The Wilhelm Raabe Literature Prize is a German literary award established in 2000 by the city of Braunschweig and the radio broadcaster Deutschlandradio. It is named after the 18th-century writer Wilhelm Raabe and is awarded for an individual work. The prize sum is 30,000 euro, making it one of the most significant German literary awards after the Georg Büchner Prize and the Joseph-Breitbach-Preis.

Recipients
Source:

 2000: Rainald Goetz for Abfall für alle
 2002: Jochen Missfeldt for Gespiegelter Himmel
 2004: Ralf Rothmann for Junges Licht
 2006: Wolf Haas for Das Wetter vor 15 Jahren
 2008: Katja Lange-Müller for Böse Schafe
 2010: Andreas Maier for Das Zimmer
 2011: Sibylle Lewitscharoff for Blumenberg
 2012: Christian Kracht for Imperium
 2013: Marion Poschmann for Die Sonnenposition
 2014: Thomas Hettche for Pfaueninsel
 2015: Clemens J. Setz for Die Stunde zwischen Frau und Gitarre
 2016: Heinz Strunk for Der goldene Handschuh
 2017: Petra Morsbach for Justizpalast
 2018: Judith Schalansky for Verzeichnis einiger Verluste
 2019: Norbert Scheuer for Winterbienen
 2020:  for Die Dame mit der bemalten Hand
 2021:  for Besichtigung eines Unglücks
 2022:  for Trottel

Previous Recipients
The award had until 1990 been known as the Wilhelm Raabe Prize.

 1944 Ricarda Huch
 1947 Fritz von Unruh
 1948 Werner Bergengruen
 1949 Ina Seidel
 1950 Hermann Hesse
 1954 Max Frisch
 1957 Friedrich Georg Jünger
 1960 Gerd Gaiser
 1963 Hans Erich Nossack
 1966 Heimito von Doderer
 1972 Walter Kempowski
 1975 Uwe Johnson
 1978 Horst Bienek
 1981 Hermann Lenz
 1984 Alois Brandstetter
 1987 Siegfried Lenz
 1990 Gerhard Köpf

References

External links
 

Awards established in 2000
Culture in Braunschweig
German literary awards